Hans Schönbaumsfeld (5 March 1900 – March 1972) was an Austrian fencer. He competed at the 1928 and 1936 Summer Olympics.

References

External links
 

1900 births
1972 deaths
Austrian male fencers
Olympic fencers of Austria
Fencers at the 1928 Summer Olympics
Fencers at the 1936 Summer Olympics